Alison Emily Thewliss (born 13 September 1982) is a Scottish National Party (SNP) politician. She has been the Member of Parliament (MP) for Glasgow Central since the May 2015 general election.

Before being elected to Westminster, Thewliss was a Glasgow City Councillor for the Calton ward, first elected in 2007. During her time as a councillor, she served as the SNP's Spokesperson on Land and Environmental Services.

On 3 December 2022, Thewliss announced her decision to stand as leader of the SNP's 44 sitting MPs at Westminster following the resignation of Ian Blackford. She was defeated by Stephen Flynn by 26 votes to 17. On 10 December 2022, Flynn appointed her SNP Spokesperson for Home Affairs.

Early life and career 
Thewliss attended Carluke High School and studied Politics and International Relations at the University of Aberdeen.

Thewliss was inspired to join the SNP at the age of seventeen following the 1997 Scottish devolution referendum. She was too young to vote in the referendum, but carried out an exit poll at a polling station as part of a Modern Studies project, which brought her into contact with representatives from Scottish political parties. Whilst still a student, she became involved in canvassing for the SNP at the 2003 Scottish Parliament election. A few months later, she was employed as a researcher for Bruce McFee MSP. By the time McFee had decided not to seek re-election in 2007, the party was looking for local election candidates. Thewliss agreed to stand for the Calton ward at the 2007 Glasgow City Council election which used a new multi-member ward system, and was one of 19 SNP candidates who gained seats previously held by Scottish Labour councillors under the previous single-member system. She was re-elected in 2012, but stood down as a councillor after being elected as MP for Glasgow Central at the 2015 general election.

In October 2020, Thewliss was elected to the SNP National Executive Committee.

Parliamentary career

Tax credits and the "rape clause"
Thewliss has campaigned on the issue of the government's revised tax credit policy restricting new claimants to two children from 2017, a policy which was introduced by then chancellor George Osborne in his July 2015 budget. She said shortly afterwards that the budget measure was "incredibly distasteful" as women who had been raped would need to justify their case when the child was their third. A requirement from April 2017 is for an explanation, tagged a "rape clause", of a woman's "exceptional circumstances" in such cases. Thewliss, who had intervened nine times in the Commons on the issue by January 2016, was among those who launched a poster campaign in Glasgow that month for the government to abandon the proposal.

How women could claim was still unclear the month before the measure was introduced. Via parliamentary questions, Thewliss had found that the training of a "professional third party" was still not arranged. It had been recommended in a 2016 Department for Work and Pensions (DWP) consultation document. Her request for an emergency parliamentary debate on the issue was rejected in March 2017. As the policy came into force, she wrote of the women affected and government officials: "Will they accept her word, or will only a criminal conviction do? We don't yet know".

Personal life
Thewliss is married to Joe Wright, a software developer. The couple had a son in 2010 and a daughter in 2013.

References

External links 

 Profile on SNP website
 personal website

1982 births
Living people
Female members of the Parliament of the United Kingdom for Scottish constituencies
Members of the Parliament of the United Kingdom for Glasgow constituencies
People from Lanark
Scottish National Party councillors
Scottish National Party MPs
UK MPs 2015–2017
UK MPs 2017–2019
UK MPs 2019–present
21st-century Scottish women politicians
21st-century Scottish politicians
Alumni of the University of Aberdeen
Politicians from South Lanarkshire
People educated at Carluke High School
Women councillors in Glasgow